Pic de Morgon (or "Grand Morgon") is a summit in the French Alps between "département des Hautes-Alpes" and "département des Alpes-de-Haute-Provence".
The summit is on the boundary between the "commune de Pontis", which it's the highest point, and the "commune de Crots". Its northern slopes is also the highest point of the "commune de Savines-le-Lac".

On "commune d'Embrun" South-West, it overlooks the abbey of Boscodon and the lake Serre-Ponçon.

The climbing is done by the Morgon's circus (Cirque de Morgon) which is well-attended during summer.

Mountains of the Alps
Mountains of Hautes-Alpes
Mountains of Alpes-de-Haute-Provence